Nogometni klub Branik Solkan, commonly referred to as NK Branik Solkan or simply Branik, was a Slovenian football club from Solkan. The club was founded in 1918 as NK Volga.

Association football clubs established in 1918
Association football clubs disestablished in 1963
Defunct football clubs in Slovenia
Football clubs in Yugoslavia